Helichrysum leucopsideum, commonly known as satin everlasting,  is a perennial herb in the family Asteraceae. It is native to southern Australia. It produces terminal flower heads, mainly between spring and early summer. The white bracts spread out or become reflexed with age.

References

leucopsideum
Asterales of Australia
Flora of New South Wales
Flora of the Northern Territory
Flora of Queensland
Flora of South Australia
Flora of Tasmania
Flora of Victoria (Australia)
Eudicots of Western Australia